The fourth season of The Real Housewives of Atlanta, an American reality television series, was broadcast on Bravo. It aired from November 6, 2011 until April 22, 2012, and was primarily filmed in Atlanta, Georgia. Its executive producers are Lauren Eskelin, Lorraine Haughton, Glenda Hersh, Carlos King, Steven Weinstock and Andy Cohen.

The Real Housewives of Atlanta focuses on the lives of NeNe Leakes, Shereé Whitfield, Kim Zolciak, Kandi Burruss, Cynthia Bailey and Phaedra Parks. It consisted of twenty-three episodes.

Production and crew
Season 4 of The Real Housewives of Atlanta was revealed along with the cast and a trailer in August, 2011.
The season premiered with a retrospective titled "Before They Were Stars" that was aired on October 30, 2011 which centered on a look at the wives in their younger years. The season officially began with "Nothing Ventured, Nothing Gained" on November 6, 2011, while the twentieth "Happiness & Joy" served as the season finale, and was aired on April 8, 2012. It was followed by a three-part reunion April 15, April 19, and April 22, 2012, which marked the conclusion of the season. 
Lauren Eskelin, Lorraine Haughton, Glenda Hersh, Carlos King, and Steven Weinstock are recognized as the series' executive producers; it is produced and distributed by True Entertainment, an American subsidiary of the Italian corporation Endemol.

Several days after the final episode of season 4 the first spin-off to The Real Housewives of Atlanta, titled Don't Be Tardy, premiered on Bravo, starring Zolciak and Kroy Biermann. The series documented the couple as they prepared for their wedding and as well as the wedding day itself.

Cast and synopsis
The fourth season saw no regular cast changes made at the beginning of the series other than introducing recurring cast member, Marlo Hampton. The season began as Zolciak was in the middle of her first pregnancy by her boyfriend Biermann; she later gave birth to their son. Leakes continued divorce proceedings with Gregg, while Whitfield found herself in financial difficulties after her ex-husband failed to pay child support. Meanwhile, Bailey opened her own modeling agency, while Parks looked to launch a family-operated funeral home. Leakes's new friendship with Hampton caused tension between all of the women, which escalated during a group vacation in South Africa; while Zolciak, who had remained home with her children, became upset by negative comments Bailey (not Burruss) made about her during the group vacation. As the season closed, Leakes began to reconsider her divorce from Gregg.

 During Hampton's appearance at the reunion, she replaces Bailey in her next to Leakes. Bailey and Burruss each move down a seat so she can sit.
 Bailey's then-husband, Peter Thomas, sits between Leakes and his wife during his appearance at the reunion.

Episodes

References

External links

2011 American television seasons
2012 American television seasons
Atlanta (season 4)